Shigeyasu (written: 重保 or 重康) is a masculine Japanese given name. Notable people with the name include:

, Japanese warrior
, Japanese general

See also
Shigeyasu Station, a railway station in Mine, Yamaguchi Prefecture, Japan

Japanese masculine given names